94.9 Joy FM (DXYL 94.9 MHz) is an FM station owned and operated by Iddes Broadcast Group. Its studios and transmitter are located at the 5th Floor, Trimix Enterprises Bldg., San Nicolas St., Brgy. Taft, Surigao City.

References

External links
Joy FM FB Page

Radio stations in Surigao del Norte
Radio stations established in 2014